Shasta Beverages is an American soft drink manufacturer that markets a value-priced soft drink line with a wide variety of soda flavors, as well as a few drink mixers, under the brand name Shasta. The company name is derived from Mount Shasta in northern California and the associated Shasta Springs.

History 

Shasta began as The Shasta Mineral Springs Company at the base of Mt. Shasta, California, in 1889. In 1928, the name was changed to The Shasta Water Company. It produced bottled mineral water from Shasta Springs in Northern California. The water was poured into glass-lined railroad cars and shipped off for local bottling.

In 1931, Shasta produced its first soft drink, a ginger ale. Until the 1950s, the company's products were mainly mixers for alcoholic drinks: mineral water, club soda, and ginger ale.

Shasta introduced new marketing strategies in the 1950s, which became industry standards: the packaging of soft drinks in cans, the introduction of low-calorie (i.e., “diet”) soft drinks, and the distribution of cans and bottles directly to grocers through wholesale channels.

By the 1960s, Shasta was a well-known brand of sodas and mixers in most of the western United States and parts of the Southwest. During the 1960s, Shasta was purchased by Consolidated Foods (later known as Sara Lee) and was renamed Shasta Beverages. In 1985, it was acquired by the National Beverage Corp., which also owns the similarly marketed Faygo line of soft drinks.

Advertising 
In the early 1980s, Shasta was expanding nationally and increasing advert spending. In 1983, the company's ad agency hired Ministry frontman Al Jourgensen (at the time a rising synth pop musician) to write and perform a jingle for a commercial.

Products
In addition to soft drinks, Shasta Beverages produces club soda and tonic water for mixing alcoholic drinks.

Soda flavors and mixers 
Shasta Beverages currently produces 34 varieties of soft drinks and mixers:

 Apple
 Black Cherry
 Diet Black Cherry
 California Dreamin' (orange creamsicle)
 Club Soda
 Cola
 Diet Cola
 Cherry Cola
 Creme Soda
 Diet Creme Soda
 Dr. Shasta (similar to Dr Pepper)
 Diet Dr. Shasta
 Fiesta Punch

 Ginger Ale
 Diet Ginger Ale
 Grape
 Diet Grape
 Kiwi Strawberry
 Mountain Rush (similar to Mountain Dew)
 Orange
 Diet Orange
 Pineapple
 Raspberry Creme (raspberry-vanilla)
 Root Beer
 Diet Root Beer

 Strawberry
 Diet Strawberry
 Tiki Punch (similar to Hawaiian Punch)
 Tonic Water
 Twist (lemon-lime)
 Diet Twist
 Very Cherry Twist
 Zazz (grapefruit)
 Diet Grapefruit

Discontinued flavors
These are the soft drink flavors that have been discontinued by Shasta Beverages, including a line of flavors targeting Hispanic consumers(‡) that was introduced in 2007.

 Arctic Sun
 Bubble Gum
 Chocolate
 Diet Chocolate
 Cranberry
 Fruit Punch (carbonated)
 Fruit Punch (non-carbonated)
 Guava-Passion Fruit
 Horchata ‡ (based on the Mexican drink of rice, cinnamon, and vanilla)
 Iced Tea with Lemon

 Jamaica ‡ (hibiscus flavored)
 Diet Kiwi Strawberry
 Lemonade
 Mango
 Pineapple Orange
 Red Apple Soda
 Red Creme Soda
 Red Pop
 Ruby Red Grapefruit
 Sangria ‡ (based on the wine-citrus drink; nonalcoholic)

 Strawberry Peach
 Diet Strawberry Peach
 Tamarindo ‡
 Tiki Blue
 Tiki Mist
 Tiki Orange Mango
 Vanilla Cola
 Diet Vanilla Cola
 Wild Raspberry

In 1993, Shasta Beverages offered flavors such as Mario Punch and Princess Toadstool Cherry, which were produced in 8-ounce cans and marketed to children.

From 2003 to 2006, Shasta Beverages sold soft drinks called Shasta Shortz that were also marketed to children. Shasta Shortz products were produced in 8-ounce cans and had sweeter, more candy-like flavors, including Bubble Gum, Camo Orange Creme, Chillin' Cherry Punch, Cotton Candy, Rah-Rah Root Beer, and Red Grape Stain.

Ingredients
Shasta Beverages uses high-fructose corn syrup as the sugar source in their drinks. Shasta diet soft drinks use sucralose and acesulfame potassium as non-nutritive sweeteners. Some of their sugar-based drinks, including their cola, use a combination of high-fructose corn syrup and sucralose. Ingredients for some of their sodas are as follows (in decreasing order by % of product):

Diet Cola: carbonated water, caramel color, phosphoric acid, citric acid, potassium citrate, sucralose, potassium benzoate (a preservative), caffeine, acesulfame potassium, natural flavor
Root Beer: carbonated water, high-fructose corn syrup, caramel color, natural and artificial flavors, potassium benzoate (preservative), sucralose
Tiki Punch: carbonated water, high-fructose corn syrup, citric acid, potassium benzoate, gum acacia, natural and artificial flavor, glyceryl abietate, red 40
Orange Soda: carbonated water, high-fructose corn syrup, citric acid, potassium benzoate (preservative), modified corn starch, glyceryl acetate, natural flavor, yellow 6, vitamin C (ascorbic acid), sucralose, calcium disodium EDTA, red 40
Black Cherry: carbonated water, high-fructose corn syrup, citric acid, natural and artificial flavors, potassium benzoate (preservative), caramel color, red 40, sucralose, blue 1
 Creme Soda: carbonated water, high-fructose corn syrup, potassium benzoate, citric acid, caramel color, artificial flavor, sucralose

References

External links 
Shasta Beverages website

1889 establishments in California
American soft drinks
Companies based in Hayward, California
Food and drink companies established in 1889
Food and drink in the San Francisco Bay Area
Drink companies based in California
1985 mergers and acquisitions